Scrobipalpa ochraceella is a moth in the family Gelechiidae. It was described by Pierre Chrétien in 1915. It is found in Algeria and Tunisia.

References

Scrobipalpa
Moths described in 1915